Kim Dong-Hae  (born March 16, 1966) is a South Korean footballer.

He graduated in Hanyang University, and played for LG Cheetahs and Suwon Samsung Bluewings.

Club career 
1989-1995 Luckey-Goldstar Hwangso /LG Cheetahs
1991-1992 Sagnmu FC (semi-professional)
1996 Suwon Samsung Bluewings

Honours

Player
 Lucky-Goldstar Hwangso
 K-League Winners (1) : 1990

Individual

References
 

K League 1 players
FC Seoul players
Suwon Samsung Bluewings players
Korea National League players
Gimcheon Sangmu FC players
South Korean footballers
1966 births
Living people
Association football midfielders